The 2018 Scottish Open (known for sponsorship reasons as the BetVictor Scottish Open) was professional ranking snooker tournament, that took place from 10 to 16 December 2018 at the Emirates Arena in Glasgow, Scotland. It is the tenth ranking event of the 2018/2019 season and a part of the Home Nations Series.

Neil Robertson was the defending champion, but he lost 2–4 to Ross Muir in the second round. The tournament was won by Mark Allen who beat Shaun Murphy in the final. Allen led 6–3, but then Murphy won four frames in a row to take a 7–6 lead. Allen, however, won the next three frames to win 9–7.	

John Higgins made the ninth maximum break of his career in the third frame of his second-round victory over Gerard Greene.

Prize fund
The breakdown of prize money for this year is shown below:

 Winner: £70,000
 Runner-up: £30,000
 Semi-final: £20,000
 Quarter-final: £10,000
 Last 16: £6,000
 Last 32: £3,500
 Last 64: £2,500
 Highest break: £2,000
 Total: £366,000

The "rolling 147 prize" for a maximum break: £20,000

Tournament draw

Top half

Section 1

Section 2

Section 3

Section 4

Bottom half

Section 5

Section 6

Section 7

Section 8

Finals

Final

Century breaks
Total: 70

 147, 104  John Higgins
 141, 124, 122, 115, 101  Shaun Murphy
 139  Lu Ning
 138  Zhou Yuelong
 136, 122, 102  Ali Carter
 136, 101  Yan Bingtao
 136  Nigel Bond
 135  Jimmy Robertson
 134, 129, 126, 110, 106  Mark Allen
 134, 111, 105  Ding Junhui
 134  Gerard Greene
 133, 104, 102, 100  Ryan Day 
 133, 103  Marco Fu
 130  Eden Sharav
 130  Yuan Sijun
 127, 119, 119, 117, 102, 101, 101  Judd Trump
 127  Zhang Anda
 122, 115, 108, 108  Stuart Carrington
 122, 108  Joe Perry
 121  Mark Davis
 119  Matthew Stevens
 115, 112  James Cahill
 114  Ross Muir
 113  Jack Lisowski
 110, 105  Kyren Wilson
 110  Gary Wilson
 109  Duane Jones
 107  Tom Ford
 107  Joe Swail
 106  Ricky Walden
 105  Ian Burns
 102  Alfie Burden
 101, 101  Zhao Xintong
 101  Elliot Slessor
 100  Luca Brecel
 100  David Gilbert
 100  Mark King
 100  Alan McManus
 100  Robbie Williams

References

Home Nations Series
2018
2018 in snooker
2018 in Scottish sport
2018
December 2018 sports events in the United Kingdom